Roman Durniok (17 February 1928 – 25 November 1993) was a Polish football defender and later manager.

References

1928 births
1993 deaths
Polish footballers
Association football defenders
Wawel Kraków players
MKS Cracovia (football) players
Ekstraklasa players
I liga players
Polish football managers
MKS Cracovia managers
Wisła Kraków managers
Sportspeople from Chorzów